Moses Denson (born July 6, 1944) is a former American football running back in the National Football League for the Washington Redskins. He played college football at the University of Maryland Eastern Shore.

Denson played three seasons for the Montreal Alouettes of the Canadian Football League (CFL). He was a CFL all-star twice, and won the Grey Cup in 1970, where his broken-play pass for a touchdown to Ted Alflen in the first quarter was the game's turning point.

References

1944 births
Living people
African-American players of Canadian football
American football running backs
Maryland Eastern Shore Hawks football players
Montreal Alouettes players
People from Monroe County, Alabama
Washington Redskins players
21st-century African-American people
20th-century African-American sportspeople